Elroy McBride (born December 23, 1993) is a Bahamian sprinter from Abaco Islands in The Bahamas who competed in the 200m and 400. He attended Moores Island All-Age School in Moore's Island where he was a part of the Exterminators Track and Field Club, Coached by Pastor Anthony Williams. He then went on to compete for Southwestern Christian College and Texas Tech University.

McBride ran the 200m at the 2015 NACAC Championships in Athletics in San Jose, Costa Rica.
He was also a part of the 4x100 relay at the 2015 Pan American Games in Toronto, Canada and the 2015 World Athletics Championships in Beijing, China. He ran on the 4x400 Relay Team at the 2017 IAAF World Relays in Nassau, Bahamas.  As a Junior he competed in the 400m and 4x400 relay at the 2012 World Junior Championships in Athletics in Barcelona, Spain.

Personal bests

References

External links
 World Athletics
 Texas Tech Profile

1993 births
Living people
Bahamian male sprinters
People from Abaco Islands
People from Central Abaco
Texas Tech Red Raiders men's track and field athletes
Texas Tech University alumni
Athletes (track and field) at the 2015 Pan American Games
Pan American Games competitors for the Bahamas
Junior college men's track and field athletes in the United States